"May the Bird of Paradise Fly up Your Nose" is a 1965 novelty song performed by Little Jimmy Dickens. It was Dickens' most successful single on the U.S. country music chart. It spent two weeks at No. 1 that November, and stayed on the chart for a total of 18 weeks. On the overall Billboard Hot 100 the song peaked at No. 15. It was his only Top 40 hit on the latter chart.

The song, written by Neal Merritt, was inspired by one of the many comic putdowns uttered by host Johnny Carson on The Tonight Show.

Content
The song features three verses, each of which mentions an incident where Dickens (the narrator) acts in a cheap and/or rude manner that insults the other person:
In the first verse, Dickens sees a beggar and proceeds to give him only a penny.
In the second verse, Dickens gets a call from his laundryman, who returns $100 that Dickens left in his clothes. Dickens gives him 10 cents, to compensate him for the phone call.
In the final verse, Dickens asks a cabdriver to rush so he can catch a train; the driver is ticketed for speeding, while Dickens stands by, waiting for the change from his fare.
The chorus is an insult, said back to Dickens, for his cheapness.

The distinctive guitar work was done by Grady Martin, using the brand new Echoplex unit which had just been released.

Chart performance

References

Songs about birds
1965 singles
Little Jimmy Dickens songs
Novelty songs
1965 songs
Columbia Records singles